Étude de la presse d'information quotidienne (EPIQ, literally "Study of daily press information") is a French audience measurement organisation which gathers readership statistics on behalf of French newspapers. It was formed in 1993 by a group of French newspaper syndicates:
 Presse quotidienne régionale ("Daily regional press")
 Presse quotidienne nationale ("Daily national press")
 Presse quotidienne urbaine gratuite ("Daily metropolitan free press")
 Presse hebdomadaire régionale ("Weekly regional press")

It conducts its research using computer-assisted telephone interviewing (CATI), for both daily and weekly newspapers. Research is conducted on its behalf by other market research organisations, notably TNS Sofres.

References

Newspapers published in France
Market research companies of France